"Hello" is the tenth single by Japanese artist Masaharu Fukuyama. It was released on February 6, 1995. It was used as the theme song to the drama Saikō no Kataomoi: White Love Story.

Track listing
Hello

Pa Pa Pa
Hello (Original karaoke)
 (Original karaoke)
Pa Pa Pa (Original karaoke)

Oricon sales chart (Japan)

References

1995 singles
Masaharu Fukuyama songs
Oricon Weekly number-one singles
Japanese television drama theme songs
1995 songs